The Maple Leaf was an international night train between New York City and Toronto, operated by the Lehigh Valley Railroad in coordination with the Canadian National Railway. It ran from Pennsylvania Station in New York City and it concluded at Toronto's Union Station. It began in 1937; and a predecessor LV train on a similar itinerary was the Toronto. The Maple Leaf and the John Wilkes were the last named passenger trains operated by the Lehigh Valley Railroad.

The route was double tracked from New York City to Niagara Falls; and in the Finger Lakes Region it bypassed several local stations. In contrast to the LV's Black Diamond and Star, it bypassed Ithaca on the northbound trip. However, in the final years of the Maple Leaf, after the discontinuance of those trains, it did stop in Ithaca. The train had an alternate section operated with the Reading Railroad, which originated at Reading Terminal in Philadelphia and linked with the main part of the Maple Leaf train in Bethlehem.

The train had its final departure on February 3, 1961.

In 1981, Amtrak and Via Rail reintroduced the Maple Leaf name for their New York–Toronto train, the first direct rail service between these cities since 1967. The modern Maple Leaf uses the Empire Corridor through New York State rather than the historic route of the Lehigh Valley train, neither entering New Jersey nor Pennsylvania.

References

Canadian National Railway
International named passenger trains
Lehigh Valley Railroad
Named passenger trains of Canada
Named passenger trains of Ontario
Named passenger trains of the United States
Night trains of Canada
Night trains of the United States
Passenger rail transportation in Pennsylvania
Passenger rail transportation in New York (state)
Passenger rail transportation in New Jersey
Railway services introduced in 1937
Railway services discontinued in 1961
Reading Company